Horace Brown may refer to:

 Horace Tabberer Brown (1848–1925), British brewer and chemist
 Horace Brown (musician), American singer
 Horace Brown (footballer) (1860–?), English footballer